Contraband was a term commonly used in the US military during the American Civil War to describe a new status for certain people who escaped slavery or those who affiliated with Union forces. In August 1861, the Union Army and the US Congress determined that the US would no longer return people who escaped slavery who went to Union lines, but they would be classified as "contraband of war," or captured enemy property. They used many as laborers to support Union efforts and soon began to pay wages. 

These self-emancipated Freedmen set up camps near Union forces, often with army assistance and supervision. The army helped to support and educate both adults and children among the refugees. Thousands of men from these camps enlisted in the United States Colored Troops when recruitment started in 1863. 

One particular Contraband Camp that had 6,000 "runaway negroes" was in Natchez, Mississippi, and was visited by USA General Ulysses S. Grant with some of his family and staff in 1863, discussed was how 300 of the runaway slaves were fit for military Union service.

By the end of the war, more than one hundred "contraband camps" were operating in the Southern United States, including the Freedmen's Colony of Roanoke Island, North Carolina. In Roanoke Island, approximately 3,500 formerly enslaved people worked to develop a self-sufficient community.

History

The status of Southern-owned slaves became an issue early in 1861, not long after hostilities began in the American Civil War. Fort Monroe, in Hampton Roads, Virginia, was a major Union stronghold which never fell to the Confederate States of America, despite its close proximity to their capital city, Richmond. On May 24, 1861, three men, Frank Baker, Shepard Mallory and James Townsend, escaped enslavement by crossing Hampton Roads harbor at night from the Confederate-occupied Norfolk County, Virginia, and seeking refuge in Fort Monroe. Prior to their escape, these three men had been forced to help construct an artillery battery at Sewell's Point, aimed at Fort Monroe. The Commander of Fort Monroe, Major General Benjamin Butler, refused to return Baker, Malloy, and Townsend, to the Confederate officer who asked to re-enslave them. 

Prior to the War, the owners of the slaves would have been legally entitled to request their return (as property) under the federal 1850 Fugitive Slave Act. But, Virginia had declared (by secession) that it no longer was part of the United States. General Butler, who was educated as an attorney, took the position that, if Virginia considered itself a foreign power to the U.S., then he was under no obligation to return the three men; he would hold them as "contraband of war." When Butler refused the request, it effectively recognized the seceded states as foreign entities. As a result, President Abraham Lincoln disapproved of it, not wanting to grant such recognition to those states.

The Term "Contraband" 
As early as 1812, the term "contraband" was used in general language to refer to illegally smuggled goods (including enslaved people). However its use was given a new context during the American Civil War after Butler's decision.

General Butler's written statements and communications with the War Department requesting guidance on the issue of fugitive slaves did not use the term "contraband." As late as August 9, 1861, he used the term "slaves" for fugitives who had come to Fort Monroe. Gen. Butler did not pay these men wages for work that they began to undertake, and he continued to refer to them as "slaves." On August 10, 1861, Acting Master William Budd of the gunboat USS Resolute first used the term in an official US military record. On September 25, 1861, the Secretary of the Navy Gideon Welles issued a directive to give "persons of color, commonly known as contrabands", in the employment of the Union Navy pay at the rate of $10 per month and a full day's ration.  Three weeks later, the Union Army followed suit, paying male "contrabands" at Fort Monroe $8 a month and females $4, specific to that command.

In August, the US Congress passed the Confiscation Act of 1861, which declared that any property used by the Confederate military, including enslaved people, could be confiscated by Union forces. The next March, its Act Prohibiting the Return of Slaves forbade returning enslaved persons to Confederate enslavers, whether private citizens or the Confederate military.

Grand Contraband Camp

The word of this policy spread quickly among enslaved communities in southeastern Virginia. While becoming a "contraband" did not mean full freedom, many people living under slavery considered it a step in that direction. The day after Butler's decision, many more people emancipated themselves by escaping and finding their way to Fort Monroe and where they appealed to become "contraband". As the number of formerly enslaved people grew too large to be housed inside the Fort, the contrabands built housing outside the crowded base . The first was Camp Hamilton, a military encampment just outside the walls of the fort. A larger encampment was built in the ruins of the City of Hampton (which had been burned by Confederate troops after learning of the plan to house the contrabands there). They called their new settlement the Grand Contraband Camp. It gained the nickname "Slabtown" due to being built from the remnants of Hampton. Conflicts arose when Union troops evicted the contrabands so that they could be quartered in the camp, and when black men living there were systematically forced to join the Union Army. 

By the end of the war in April 1865, less than four years later, an estimated 10,000 people escaped slavery and applied to gain "contraband" status, with many living nearby. Across the South, Union forces managed more than 100 contraband camps, although not all were as large. The 1,500 contrabands behind federal lines at Harpers Ferry were kidnapped and re-enslaved when Confederates took the town. From a camp on Roanoke Island that started in 1862, Horace James developed the Freedmen's Colony of Roanoke Island (1863–1867). Appointed by the Union Army, James was a Congregational chaplain who, with the freedmen, tried to create a self-sustaining colony at the island.

Education Efforts 

Within the Grand Contraband Camp, the pioneering teacher Mary S. Peake began to teach both adult and child contrabands to read and write. She was the first Black teacher hired by the American Missionary Association, which also sent numerous Northern white teachers across the South to teach newly-emancipated Black people both during the Civil War and in the Reconstruction era. The area where Peake taught in Elizabeth City County later became part of the campus of Hampton University, a historically black college. Defying a Virginia law against educating slaves, Peake and other teachers held classes outdoors under a large oak tree. In 1863, President Abraham Lincoln's Emancipation Proclamation was read to the contrabands and free blacks there, for which the tree was named the Emancipation Oak. 

By 1863, a total of four schools had been set up in the Camp by the American Missionary Association, including one at the former home of disgraced President John Tyler.

For most of the contrabands, full emancipation did not take place until the Thirteenth Amendment to the United States Constitution, which abolished slavery except for incarcerated people, was ratified in late 1865.

Development of other Contraband Camps
Contraband camps developed around many Union-held forts and encampments. In 1863, after the Emancipation Proclamation and authorization of black military units, thousands of free black people began to enlist in the United States Colored Troops. The Army allowed their families to take refuge at contraband camps. The black troops ultimately comprised nearly ten percent of all the troops in the Union Army.

By the end of the war, more than one hundred contraband camps had been developed in the South. Many were assisted by missionary teachers recruited from the North by the American Missionary Association and other groups who, together with free blacks and freedmen, agreed that education of the formerly enslaved people was of the highest priority. The teachers often wrote about the desire of freed people, both adults and children, for education.

Gallery

See also
"Oh! Let My People Go"
American Missionary Association
Mary S. Peake
Port Royal Experiment

References

Further reading

External links
 Documents, The Roanoke Island Freedmen's Colony - letters from missionary teachers, Horace James and freedmen available online

1861 establishments in the United States
1865 disestablishments in the United States
History of Hampton, Virginia
Slavery in the United States
Social history of the American Civil War
Virginia in the American Civil War
Fugitive American slaves
Military emancipation in the American Civil War